Lowry Egerton Cole, 4th Earl of Enniskillen,  (21 December 1845 – 28 April 1924), styled Viscount Cole from 1850 to 1886, was an Irish peer and Conservative Member of Parliament.

Background
Cole was the second – but eldest surviving – son of William Willoughby Cole, 3rd Earl of Enniskillen and his wife, Jane Casamaijor.

He was educated at Eton College.

Political career
As Lord Cole, he was appointed High Sheriff of Fermanagh for 1870 and then elected to the House of Commons for Enniskillen in 1880, a seat he held until 1885 when the constituency was abolished. The following year he succeeded his father as fourth Earl of Enniskillen and entered the House of Lords.

Lord Enniskillen was appointed a Knight of the Order of St Patrick (KP) in the 1902 Coronation Honours list published on 26 June 1902, and was invested by the Lord Lieutenant of Ireland, Earl Cadogan, at Dublin Castle on 11 August 1902.

Personal life

Lord Enniskillen married Charlotte Marion Baird, daughter of wealthy Scottish businessman Douglas Baird and his wife Charlotte Acton, in 1869. The following year he was cited as one of two co-respondents in the case for divorce brought by Sir Charles Mordaunt, 10th Bt., a former M.P., against his wife, Harriet, in which Prince Albert Edward, The Prince of Wales (later King Edward VII), was called to give evidence. The divorce was denied as Lady Mordaunt was judged to be insane, but was finally granted in 1875 when Cole did not contest the claim that he was the father of Lady Mordaunt's daughter, Violet (1869–1928), later Marchioness of Bath. Lord Enniskillen died in April 1924, aged 78, and was succeeded in his titles by his second – but eldest surviving – son John. Lady Enniskillen died in 1937.

The third son of Lord Enniskillen was The Hon. Galbraith Lowry Egerton Cole (1881–1929), a pioneer settler (1905) of the East Africa Protectorate. His Kekopey Ranch on Lake Elementaita, Kenya, where he is buried, is preserved today as the Lake Elementaita Lodge.

His daughter, Lady Florence Anne Cole, married Hugh Cholmondeley, 3rd Baron Delamere of Vale Royal (b. 28 Apr 1870, d. 13 Nov 1931).

Notes

References
Kidd, Charles, Williamson, David (editors). Debrett's Peerage and Baronetage (1990 edition). New York: St Martin's Press, 1990, 

 Malcolmson, A. P. W. 'The Enniskillen Family, Estate and Archive'. Clogher Record 16 (2), 1998, pp. 81–122.

External links

1845 births
1924 deaths
Cole family (Anglo-Irish aristocracy)
Deputy Lieutenants of Fermanagh
Earls of Enniskillen
High Sheriffs of County Fermanagh
Knights of St Patrick
Members of the Parliament of the United Kingdom for County Fermanagh constituencies (1801–1922)
People educated at Eton College
Rifle Brigade officers
UK MPs 1880–1885
Enniskillen, E4